Shaira Lenn Osuna Roberto (born August 9, 1996), professionally known as Sanya Lopez, is a Filipino actress known for her portrayal in the afternoon series, The Half Sisters, as Lorna. In 2016, Lopez gained media attention and rose to fame after being announced as the new Hara Danaya of the 2016 television remake of GMA Network's Encantadia.

Early life and background 
Sanya Lopez was born Shaira Lenn Osuna Roberto on August 9, 1996, and raised in Malolos, Bulacan. She is the daughter of Marlyn Roberto and Ramil Roberto, who died when Lopez was two years old. She is the younger sister of actor Jak Roberto. At the age of 14, Lopez met German Moreno and came to see him as a father figure; she dedicates her performance both to Moreno and her father. She was given the name Sanya, of Indian origin, by her manager.

Sanya currently resides in Quezon City with her brother Jak.

Career

2012–2015: Early career 

Lopez's career started in 2012 when she was accidentally discovered by the late German Moreno on the set of Walang Tulugan with the Master Showman, wherein her brother, Jak Roberto was a mainstay. In an interview, Lopez detailed how fans mistook her for another actress, Kim Rodriguez, who was also on the said show. Since then, Moreno included her on the program as one of his co-hosts.

2016–2019: Breakthrough and transition to lead roles 
After which, Lopez was given supporting roles at various afternoon series of GMA Network including Dormitoryo and The Half Sisters, wherein she played as Lorna, the best friend of the lead actress, Barbie Forteza. In 2015, Lopez auditioned and acquired the role of Danaya in the television remake of Encantadia, originally by Bubble Gang former cast Diana Zubiri which she considers her biggest television break. Zubiri, on the other hand, congratulated Lopez for bagging the role on her Twitter account.

After Encantadia, she proceeded to accept lead roles for Haplos, Cain at Abel, and Dahil sa Pag-ibig.

2021–present: Career resurgence 

In February of 2020, she was announced to play the leading lady in Agimat ng Agila topbilled by Bong Revilla. In October the same year, she was announced to play Melody Reyes in First Yaya, replacing Marian Rivera who backed out due to health concerns. 
In 2021, both shows aired around the same time, increasing her fame. They were such a hit that they were both granted a second season in 2022 with her character in Agimat ng Agila having to be killed off due to scheduling conflicts with the second season of First Yaya which went under the title First Lady.

In 2023 she will be playing legendary warrior Urduja in the upcoming series, Mga Lihim ni Urduja with her fellow Encantadia co-stars Kylie Padilla and Gabbi Garcia.

Filmography

Television series

Television series (as a guest star)

Film

Awards

References

External links 
 
 Sanya Lopez on Instagram

1996 births
Living people
Filipino television actresses
Filipino female models
Filipina gravure idols
GMA Network personalities
Actresses from Laguna (province)
Actresses from Bulacan
People from Malolos
Tagalog people